Dawid Kurminowski (born 24 February 1999) is a Polish professional footballer who plays as a forward for Ekstraklasa club Zagłębie Lubin, on loan from Danish Superliga club AGF.

In the 2020–21 season, he became a top scorer of Slovak league with 19 goals.

Club career

MFK Zemplín Michalovce
Kurminowski made his Fortuna Liga debut for Zemplín Michalovce against DAC Dunajská Streda on 24 February 2018. Kurminowski replaced Sadam Sulley in the second half, when Michalovce were one down. In stoppage time, Christián Herc connected to set the final score to 2-0 for DAC.

AGF
On 12 August 2021, Kurminowski signed a five-year contract with Danish Superliga club AGF.

Loan to Zagłębie
On 1 September 2022, he joined Ekstraklasa side Zagłębie Lubin on a season-long loan, with an option to make the move permanent.

Personal life
Kurminowski is fluent in Polish and Slovak.

Honours
Individual
 Slovak Super Liga top scorer: 2020–21

References

External links
 MŠK Žilina official club profile
 
 
 Futbalnet profile
 

1999 births
Living people
People from Śrem
Polish footballers
Polish expatriate footballers
Poland youth international footballers
Poland under-21 international footballers
Association football forwards
Lech Poznań II players
Lech Poznań players
MFK Zemplín Michalovce players
MŠK Žilina players
Aarhus Gymnastikforening players
Zagłębie Lubin players
III liga players
Ekstraklasa players
Slovak Super Liga players
2. Liga (Slovakia) players
Danish Superliga players
Expatriate footballers in Slovakia
Polish expatriate sportspeople in Slovakia
Expatriate men's footballers in Denmark
Polish expatriate sportspeople in Denmark